Potomac Avenue is an island-platformed Washington Metro station bordering the Barney Circle, Capitol Hill and Hill East neighborhoods of Southeast Washington, D.C., United States. The station was opened on July 1, 1977, and is operated by the Washington Metropolitan Area Transit Authority (WMATA). The station currently provides service for the Blue, Orange, and Silver Lines. The station serves a dense residential area of Southeast Washington around Potomac Avenue and is located at 14th and G Streets.

History
Orange Line service to the station began upon the line's opening on November 20, 1978. Silver Line service at Potomac Avenue began on July 26, 2014.

On February 1, 2023, 64-year-old transit worker Robert Cunningham was killed and three others were injured in an incident involving a gunman. The attacker started an altercation on a bus, followed a passenger off and shot him in the legs, then went down to the station and shot another person in the before he confronted a woman. A transit worker tried to protect the woman and was shot. The attacker, Isaiah Trotman, was taken into custody and hospitalized. According to police records and his lawyer, Trotman has a criminal history and struggles with mental illness. Trotman was enrolled in a behavioral program but had not been seen for over a week prior to the shooting. He had been charged with several drug-related crimes in Pennsylvania in April 2022 and was awaiting sentencing after a plea deal.

Station layout

Notable places nearby 
 Congressional Cemetery, 3 blocks northeast on Potomac Avenue

References

External links

 

 The Schumin Web Transit Center: Potomac Ave Station
 14th Street entrance from Google Maps Street View

Washington Metro stations in Washington, D.C.
Stations on the Blue Line (Washington Metro)
Stations on the Orange Line (Washington Metro)
Stations on the Silver Line (Washington Metro)
Railway stations in the United States opened in 1977
1977 establishments in Washington, D.C.
Capitol Hill
Railway stations located underground in Washington, D.C.